Bruce Miller is an American television writer and producer. He is best known for Eureka (2006), The 100 (2014) and The Handmaid's Tale (2017). For his work on The Handmaid's Tale, Miller won the 2017 Primetime Emmy Award for Outstanding Drama Series and Outstanding Writing for a Drama Series, as well as the Golden Globe Award for Best Television Series – Drama. It was the first show on a streaming platform to win an Emmy for Outstanding Series. More recently, Miller signed an overall development deal with ABC Signature and Hulu.

Personal life and education 
Miller grew up in Stamford, Connecticut, and graduated from Brown University in 1987.

Television

Film

References

External links

Living people
American television writers
American television producers
Primetime Emmy Award winners
Year of birth missing (living people)

Brown University alumni